Jean Jacques Charles Ausseil (30 April 1925 – 4 February 2001) was Minister of State for Monaco between 1985 and 1991.

References

 

Ministers of State of Monaco
1925 births
2001 deaths